Joseph John Franklin (June 18, 1870 – April 28, 1940) was a United States Marine who received the Medal of Honor during the Spanish–American War.

Biography
Franklin was born on June 18, 1870, in Buffalo, New York. He joined the Marine Corps from Boston in January 1896, and was awarded the Medal of Honor for his actions at the Battle of Cienfuegos. He retired with the rank of Sergeant Major in August 1929.

Franklin died on April 28, 1940, and is buried in Cypress Hills Cemetery, Brooklyn, New York. His grave can be found in the laurel green section, block 1, grave 312

Medal of Honor citation
Rank and organization: Private, U.S. Marine Corps. Born: 18 June 1870, Buffalo, N.Y. Accredited to: New York. G.O. No.: 521, 7 July 1899.

Citation:

On board the U.S.S. Nashville during the operation of cutting the cable leading from Cienfuegos, Cuba, 11 May 1898. Facing the heavy fire of the enemy, Franklin set an example of extraordinary bravery and coolness throughout this action.

See also

List of Medal of Honor recipients for the Spanish–American War

References

External links

1870 births
1940 deaths
United States Marine Corps Medal of Honor recipients
United States Marines
American military personnel of the Spanish–American War
Military personnel from Buffalo, New York
Spanish–American War recipients of the Medal of Honor